Bohanon Park is a city park located in the Lind-Bohanon neighborhood of Minneapolis, MN.

Borders
The parks is surrounded by North Dupont Ave to the west, North Bryant Ave to the east and 49th Ave North to the south. The park shares a border with Jenny Lind Elementary School to the north.

Amenities
Ice skating rink
Baseball/softball fields
Cricket field
Tennis courts
Basketball courts
Playground equipment

Parks in Minneapolis